Temple Stone is a live album by the Japanese band Ghost. It was originally released in 1994 then reissued by Drag City in 1997.

The album features a performance of the traditional folk song "Blood Red River".

Track listing
 "Moungod Radiant Youth" – 4:47
 "Guru in the Echo" – 4:24
 "Under the Sun" – 6:18
 "Moungod Asleep" – 5:57
 "Freedom" (A.K.A. People Get Freedom) – 6:29
 "Rakshu" – 6:31
 "Blood Red River" – 6:00
 "Orange Sunshine" – 4:23
 "Giver's Chant" – 3:13
 "Sun is Tangging" – 8:56

Personnel
Masaki Batoh – 12-string guitar, hurdy-gurdy, vocals
Kazuo Ogino – piano, organ, recorder, Tibetan horn, harp
Junichi Yamamoto – bass, bamboo flute, percussion, harmony
Taishi Takizawa – cello, flute, saxophone, percussion, harmony
Daisuke Naganuma – viola on 1, drums on 1, 6 and 7
Taku Sugimoto – cello on 1, 6, 7 and 9
Iwao Yamazaki – drums on 3
Kohji Nishino – bass on 3
Michio Kurihara – electric guitar on 9
Setsuko Furuya – percussion on 9

Recording locations
Seiryu Temple – tracks 1, 2, 3, 6, 7 and 9
Waseda Salvation Church – 4, 5, 8 and 10

References

Ghost (1984 band) albums
1994 live albums
Drag City (record label) live albums